Kallima knyvetti, the scarce blue oakleaf, is a species of leaf mimic butterfly found in Southeast Asia.

Description

Male upperside forewing: basal area to near apex of cell and thence obliquely to the zigzag subterminal line as it crosses interspace 1 dark green, succeeded by a black line along the discocellulars, and a broad sinuous discal band (not curved as in Kallima horsfieldii) bluish white below vein 3, pure white with bluish suffused inner margin above vein 3 to costa; measured on the costal margin, the outer edge of this band less than half the length of the wing from base, the rest of the wing to apex black, with a preapical white spot; a medial discal hyaline (glass-like) spot in interspace 2. Hindwing: dark ochraceous brown, the costal margin and apex broadly and the abdominal fold much paler brown, irrorated (sprinkled) with scattered dusky scales; vein 1 and the abdominal fold with long soft brown, hairs. Forewings and hindwings with a dark subterminal zigzag line commencing somewhat below vein 3 on the forewing. Underside as in Kallima inachus protectively coloured. Antennae black; head and thorax anteriorly dark green, thorax posteriorly and abdomen olivaceous brown.

Wingspan 108–112 mm.

Distribution
Sikkim; Bhutan: Assam, the Naga Hills; Tenasserim.

References

Kallimini
Butterflies of Asia
Butterflies described in 1886